Acliceratia is a genus of very small, somewhat amphibious land snails that have a gill and an operculum, semi-terrestrial gastropod mollusks or micromollusk  in the family Iravadiidae.

These tiny snails live in damp habitat (under rotting vegetation) that is very close to the edge of the sea; they can tolerate being washed with saltwater during especially high tides. These snails are sometimes listed as land snails and at other times they are listed as marine snails.

Species
Species within the genus Acliceratia include:
 Acliceratia beddomei (Dautzenberg, 1912)
 Acliceratia carinata (Smith, 1871)

References

Iravadiidae